The 1973 English cricket season was the 74th in which the County Championship had been an official competition. Hampshire win the championship and Kent dominated the limited overs tournaments.

Honours
County Championship - Hampshire
Gillette Cup - Gloucestershire
Sunday League - Kent
Benson & Hedges Cup - Kent
Minor Counties Championship - Shropshire
Second XI Championship - Essex II 
Wisden - Keith Boyce, Bevan Congdon, Keith Fletcher, Roy Fredericks, Peter Sainsbury

Test series

1973 saw New Zealand and West Indies tour England. Whilst beating New Zealand 2–0 in the three match series, England went down 2–0 to the West Indies, losing the final test by an innings and 226 runs.

County Championship

Gillette Cup

Benson & Hedges Cup

Sunday League

Leading batsmen

Leading bowlers

References

Annual reviews
 Playfair Cricket Annual 1974
 Wisden Cricketers' Almanack 1974

External links
 CricketArchive – season and tournament itineraries

1973 in English cricket
English cricket seasons in the 20th century